Norwegian County Road 174 is  long and runs between Nordby and Dalstua in Ullensaker, Norway. Prior to 1 January 2010, it was known as National Road 174. 

174
174
Roads in Ullensaker